Good Thing(s), The Good Thing(s) or A Good Thing may refer to:

Albums 
 A Good Thing (album), by Allen Mezquida, 1996
 Good Thing (Rebecka Törnqvist album), 1995
 Good Thing (Leon Bridges album), 2018
 Good Things (Aloe Blacc album), 2010
 Good Things (Dan + Shay album), 2021
 Good Things (Looptroop Rockers album), 2008
 Good Things, a 2000 album by Toni Lynn Washington
 The Good Things, a 2008 album by Jill Phillips

Songs 
 "Good Thing" (Eternal song), 1995
 "Good Thing" (Fine Young Cannibals song), 1989
 "Good Thing" (Rebecka Törnqvist song), 1995
 "Good Thing" (Sage the Gemini song), 2015
 "Good Thing" (Zedd and Kehlani song), 2019
 "Good Thing", by IOYOU, a predecessor of Westlife
 "Good Thing", by The Jesus Lizard from Head
 "Good Thing", by Lynyrd Skynyrd from Lynyrd Skynyrd 1991
 "Good Thing", by Paul Revere & The Raiders from The Spirit of '67
 "Good Thing", by Reel Big Fish from Cheer Up!
 "Good Thing", by Rosie Ribbons
 "Good Thing", by Sam Smith from In the Lonely Hour
 "Good Thing", by The Woodentops from Giant (The Woodentops album)
 "Good Thing", by Jolin Tsai from Magic
 "Good Thing", by Zebrahead
 "Good Things", by BoDeans from Black and White
 "Good Things", by Grand Funk Railroad from Born to Die
 "Good Things", by Rich Boy from the self-titled album
 "Good Things", by Sascha Schmitz from Open Water
 "The Good Thing", by Talking Heads from More Songs About Buildings and Food
 "The Good Things", by Cherry Poppin' Daddies from Susquehanna
 "A Good Thing" (song), a 2005 song by Saint Etienne
"A Good Thing", song by Buster Jones, 1969
"A Good Thing", song by Charles Mann, member of the Louisiana Music Hall of Fame	 
"A Good Thing", song by The Sneetches, 1993

Other uses 
 The Good Things (film), a 2001 American short
 Good Things, a 1971 cookbook by Jane Grigson
Good Things (Australian music festival), a music festival held in Australia

See also 
 All Good Things (disambiguation)
 Good Thang (disambiguation)